Guanidinoacetate methyltransferase deficiency (GAMT deficiency) is an autosomal recessive cerebral creatine deficiency that primarily affects the nervous system and muscles. It is the first described disorder of creatine metabolism, and results from deficient activity of guanidinoacetate methyltransferase, an enzyme involved in the synthesis of creatine.  Clinically, affected individuals often present with hypotonia, seizures and developmental delay.  Diagnosis can be suspected on clinical findings, and confirmed by specific biochemical tests, brain magnetic resonance spectroscopy, or genetic testing.  Biallelic pathogenic variants in GAMT are the underlying cause of the disorder.  After GAMT deficiency is diagnosed, it can be treated by dietary adjustments, including supplementation with creatine.  Treatment is highly effective if started early in life. If treatment is started late, it cannot reverse brain damage which has already taken place.

Signs and symptoms
Individuals with GAMT deficiency appear normal at birth.  Shortly after birth, infants may start to show signs, as the consequences of decreased creatine levels in their body become more apparent.  These clinical findings are relatively non-specific, and do not immediately suggest a disorder of creatine metabolism. Common clinical findings, as with other cerebral creatine deficiencies, include developmental delay (both intellectual and motor), seizures and hypotonia.  Speech delay, autism, and self-injurious behaviour have also been described.

Genetics
Biallelic pathogenic variants in GAMT are associated with guanidinoacetate methyltransferase deficiency. This gene codes for the enzyme guanidinoacetate methyltransferase (GAMT), which participates in the two-step synthesis of the compound creatine from amino acids glycine, arginine and methionine. Specifically, GAMT controls the second step of the sequence, in which creatine is produced from another compound called guanidinoacetate. The effects of GAMT deficiency are most severe in organs and tissues that require large amounts of energy, such as the brain and muscles.

This disorder is inherited in an autosomal recessive manner, which means the causative gene is located on an autosome, and two defective copies of the gene – one from each parent – are required to inherit the disorder. The parents both carry one pathogenic variant, however they are not affected by the disorder.  As carriers, the residual activity of approximately 50% is enough to avoid clinical complications.  Unaffected siblings of an affected individual have a 2/3 chance of being carriers.

Diagnosis
GAMT deficiency can be suspected from clinical findings, although clinical findings are not suggestive of a specific diagnosis.  Laboratory testing of plasma and urine will show decreased levels of creatine and increased levels of guanidinoacetate.  Non-specific elevations of metabolites on urine testing, such as organic acid analysis, that are normalized to creatinine may be observed.  For these tests, the excretion of urine metabolites is not elevated, but appears elevated due to unusually low creatinine values.  Specific diagnostic testing for GAMT deficiency relies on the measurement of guanidinoacetate and creatine in urine and plasma.  Increased levels of guanidinoacetate and decreased levels of creatine can suggest a diagnosis.  Confirmatory testing can include enzyme assays to directly measure guanidinoacetate methyltransferase activity or molecular testing of GAMT. Brain magnetic resonance spectroscopy will show decreased levels of creatine, in affected individuals, however this finding is seen in all three cerebral creatine deficiencies, and needs to be followed up to identify the specific defect.

Treatment is most effective for GAMT deficiency with early diagnosis, however the non-specific clinical findings mean there is often a delay in diagnosis.  Due to the efficacy of treatment and the delay in diagnosis, GAMT deficiency has been a candidate for newborn screening programs.  Newborn screening assays measure the amount of guanidinoacetate in a dried blood spot using tandem mass spectrometry.  Abnormal results from a newborn screening test still need to be confirmed by testing in plasma or urine.  GAMT deficiency was nominated to be included in the list of disorders recommended for screening in the United States in 2016.  It was not recommended for inclusion, as studies completed at the time could not demonstrate that a case could be reliably identified in a newborn screening setting.  Utah started screening for GAMT deficiency in all newborns in 2015.  New York started screening newborns in late 2018, and Michigan planned to start in 2019.

Treatment
Treatment of GAMT deficiency focuses on restoration of depleted brain creatine with creatine supplementation in pharmacologic doses, and removal of toxic intermediates via ornithine supplementation. All patients are reported to benefit by this treatment, with improvements in muscular hypotonia, dyskinesia, social contact, alertness and behavior. Seizures appear to reduce more with dietary arginine restriction and ornithine supplementation. Despite treatment, none of the patients have been reported to return to completely normal developmental level, if significant damage had taken place before treatment.  Prior to the addition of GAMT deficiency to newborn screening panels, younger siblings of affected individuals may have been tested at birth and treated early.  This early treatment can result in outcomes that are very close to normal.

References

Further reading
 National Library of Medicine. MedlinePlus - Guanidinoacetate methyltransferase deficiency
 GeneReview/NIH/UW entry on Cerebral Creatine Deficiency syndromes

External links 

Amino acid metabolism disorders
Autosomal recessive disorders
Rare diseases